"Floods" is a song by American heavy metal band Pantera from their 1996 album The Great Southern Trendkill. A ballad, it is the longest song on the album and the third-longest song the band has recorded, after "Cemetery Gates" (7:03) and "Hard Lines, Sunken Cheeks" (7:01). An early mix of the song was released on the 20th anniversary edition of The Great Southern Trendkill.

Background
Pantera bassist Rex Brown said about "Floods": That was one of my favorite bass lines on that song. We'd rehearsed it a couple of times and Dime and I sat down for quite a while with that. It was more of trying to get yourself in a mellow mood. It's a blazing solo with a really cool rhythm section underneath it - I'm really proud of the bass line. I think that was Dime's favorite solo on that song.

The lyrics of the song tell about atrocious acts committed by mankind such as rape, murder, and war, and contain a plea to God to flood the earth in a fashion like that described in the biblical Book of Genesis.

Guitar solo
The song features one of Dimebag Darrell's most popular guitar solos. The solo was originally a riff written by Darrell in the mid-1980s, and footage exists of him performing these licks as early as 1986. Guitar World magazine voted his solo as the 19th-greatest of all time. Darrell built the solo from his improvized solos he played in concerts.

Darrell on the solo:
 

Darrell also said: I picked up the idea of doubling from Randy Rhoads. It seemed appropriate to start off in a slow, melodic fashion and then build and build and build to the climax with the big harmonic squeals at the end.

For that last big note I think there's four guitars going on. There's a squeal at the second fret of the G string, a squeal at the fifth fret of the G and then I used a DigiTech Whammy pedal on two-string squeals at the harmonics at the fourth and 12th frets of the G and B strings, I believe. That was one of those deals where I didn't plan it out.

I just sat there and fucked with it until it sounded right.

Reception
Classic Rock writer Stephen Dalton described "Floods" as "Pantera's 'Bohemian Rhapsody'". Dalton also described it as "a seven-minute, shape-shifting, post-apocalyptic epic featuring one of Dimebag Darrell's finest solos, an octave-vaulting baroque ejaculation that sounds like Brian May on steroids".

Metal Hammer ranked "Floods" 9th on their list of the 50 best Pantera songs. They described it as an all-time classic.

Guitar World ranked the song 20th on their list of the 25 greatest Pantera songs.

References

Songs about floods
1996 singles
Pantera songs
1990s ballads
Heavy metal ballads
Song recordings produced by Terry Date
Songs written by Dimebag Darrell
Songs written by Vinnie Paul
Songs written by Phil Anselmo
Songs written by Rex Brown
1996 songs
East West Records singles